Hornblower is a series of British historical fiction war television films based on three of C. S. Forester's ten novels about the fictional character Horatio Hornblower, a Royal Navy officer during the French Revolutionary and Napoleonic Wars.

The series ran from 7 October 1998 until 6 January 2003, with Ioan Gruffudd in the title role. It was produced by the British broadcaster ITV Meridian, and was shown on ITV in the UK and A&E in the US. It is often repeated on ITV4.

Main cast

 Ioan Gruffudd as Midshipman (and later Lieutenant and Commander) Horatio Hornblower
 Robert Lindsay as Captain (and later Commodore and Admiral) Sir Edward Pellew
 Jamie Bamber as Midshipman (and later Lieutenant) Archie Kennedy (Films 1, 3-6)
 Paul McGann as Lieutenant William Bush (Films 5-8)
 Paul Copley as Matthews, Boatswain
 Sean Gilder as Styles, Boatswain's Mate
 Jonathan Coy as Lieutenant (later Commander) Bracegirdle (Films 1-4, 8)
 Dorian Healy as Midshipman Jack Simpson (Film 1)
 Simon Sherlock as Oldroyd (Films 1-4)
 Chris Barnes as Finch (Films 1-2)
 Ian McElhinney as Captain Hammond (Films 2, 5-7)
 Colin MacLachlan as Ship's Master Bowles (Films 1-4)
 David Warner as Captain James Sawyer (Films 5-6)
 David Rintoul as Dr. Clive, Ship's Surgeon (Films 5-6)
 Nicholas Jones as Lieutenant Buckland (Films 5-6)
 Philip Glenister as Hobbs (Films 5-6)
 Lorcan Cranitch as Wolfe (Films 7-8)
 Julia Sawalha as Maria Mason (Films 7-8)
 Barbara Flynn as Mrs. Mason (Films 7-8)
 Jonathan Forbes as Midshipman Orrock (Films 7-8)

Other well-known actors appeared in guest roles, including Michael Byrne, Denis Lawson, Antony Sher, Ian McNeice, Andrew Tiernan, Samuel West, Christian Coulson, Cherie Lunghi, Greg Wise and Ronald Pickup.

The film series
The series consists of eight television films, which are notable for their high production values. All were later released on DVD (with the original aspect ratio of 16:9 widescreen in Europe and 4:3 in the US). In the US, the series was retitled Horatio Hornblower, and some of the films were known by different titles. The eight films cover the events of just three of the ten novels (Mr. Midshipman Hornblower, Lieutenant Hornblower, and Hornblower and the Hotspur), and various alterations and additions are made to the source material (e.g., the recurring characters of Lt. Archie Kennedy, Matthews and Styles).

 The Even Chance (U.S. title: The Duel) (7 October 1998)
 The Examination for Lieutenant (U.S. title: The Fire Ship) (18 November 1998)
 The Duchess and the Devil (24 February 1999)
 The Frogs and the Lobsters (U.S. title: The Wrong War) (2 April 1999)
 Mutiny (8 April 2001)
 Retribution (15 April 2001)
 Loyalty (5 January 2003)
 Duty (6 January 2003)

Production
Captain Pellew's ship, is represented by the Grand Turk, a modern copy of the frigate  built in 1741. To represent Hornblower's ship, HMS Hotspur, the Earl of Pembroke, a civilian ship, underwent some conversion. The Baltic trading schooner Julia and the brig Phoenix of Dell Quay were used to represent the smaller vessels. No real 74-gun ship existed any longer at the time of production (the last one, HMS Implacable, was scuttled in 1949), so HMS Justinian and HMS Renown had to be recreated as models. For the first series a quarter of a 74-gun ship (one exterior side and three open sides to shoot live action on several decks) called the pontoon was built. Later live action on the quarterdeck or the gundeck below was shot on the actual HMS Victory. Eleven scale models, ranging from 4.5 to 7 m in length, were used for the battle scenes, the largest weighing 1400 kg, and made with working rigging and cannons that were fired by remote control. Shooting locations included the Black Sea, the Livadia Palace, Portugal, and the former administration (Melville) building of the Royal William Yard and the Barbican, Plymouth in England.

Awards
 Primetime Emmy Award for Outstanding Miniseries (1999)
 Primetime Emmy Award for Outstanding Single-Camera Picture Editing for a Miniseries or Movie (1999)

Future
Ioan Gruffudd had shown interest in participating in more Hornblower films. In 2007, he reportedly discussed the possibility of a big-screen version of Hornblower, and had been attempting to gain the rights to the books by C. S. Forester."

References

External links
 
 
 
 
 
 
 
 

 
1990s British drama television series
2000s British drama television series
1998 British television series debuts
2003 British television series endings
1998 television films
1998 films
1999 television films
1999 films
2002 television films
2002 films
2003 television films
2003 films
English-language television shows
Films based on British novels
Films based on historical novels
Films based on military novels
Films set in France
Films set in the 1790s
Films set in the 1800s
French Revolutionary Wars films
British historical television series
British military television series
Nautical television series
Napoleonic Wars films
Primetime Emmy Award for Outstanding Miniseries winners
Primetime Emmy Award-winning television series
ITV television dramas
Television shows based on British novels
Television shows produced by Meridian Broadcasting
Television series by ITV Studios
Television series produced at Pinewood Studios
Napoleonic Wars in fiction
War television series
2000s English-language films
1990s English-language films